Live Acoustic may refer to:

 Live Acoustic (Sarah McLachlan EP)
 Live Acoustic (VersaEmerge EP)
 Live Acoustic (Avril Lavigne EP)
 Live Acoustic (The Auteurs EP)
 Live Acoustic (Dua Lipa EP)

See also
 Live and Acoustic (disambiguation)